A list of St Ives artists, artists who have lived in the town of St Ives in Cornwall, southwest England, are as follows:

19th century

Early and mid 20th century

Late 20th century/ 21st century

Gallery

See also

 Barbara Hepworth Museum and Sculpture Garden
 St Ives School
 Tate St Ives art gallery

References

External links

 Artcornwall.org online journal for art, artists and galleries in Cornwall and adjacent regions

 
 
St. Ives artists
Saint Ives
Arts in St Ives, Cornwall
St Ives